Ebrima Jatta may refer to:
 Ebrima Jatta (footballer, born 1987)
 Ebrima Jatta (footballer, born 2002)